NGC 7060 is an intermediate spiral galaxy located about 200 million light-years away in the constellation of Microscopium. The spiral arms of NGC 7060 appear to overlap. NGC 7060 was discovered by astronomer John Herschel on September 2, 1836.

NGC 7060 is the dominant member of a small group of galaxies known as the NGC 7060 group. Other members of the group are NGC 7057, NGC 7072, and NGC 7072A.

See also 
 List of NGC objects (7001–7840)

References

External links 

Intermediate spiral galaxies
Microscopium
7060
66732
Astronomical objects discovered in 1836